Freddie S. Summers (born February 16, 1947) was a former American football defensive back who played three seasons with the Cleveland Browns of the National Football League. He was drafted by the Cleveland Browns in the fourth round of the 1969 NFL Draft. He first enrolled at McCook Community College before transferring to Wake Forest University, where he played quarterback. Summers attended Dorchester High School in Dorchester, Boston, Massachusetts. On June 15, 1972, he was traded to the New York Giants in exchange for the Giants second pick in the 1973 NFL Draft. He was placed on injured waivers on August 30, 1972.

References

External links
Just Sports Stats
College stats

1947 births
Players of American football from Columbia, South Carolina
American football defensive backs
American football quarterbacks
Wake Forest Demon Deacons football players
Cleveland Browns players
New York Giants players
1994 deaths